Arnyashevo (Ärnäş) is a rural locality (a village) in Teplyakovsky Selsoviet, Burayevsky District, Bashkortostan, Russia. The population was 102 as of 2010. There are 3 streets.

Geography 
Arnyashevo is located 28 km northeast of Burayevo (the district's administrative centre) by road. Nikolayevka is the nearest rural locality.

References 

Rural localities in Burayevsky District